DOK-ING d.o.o. is a Croatian company which manufactures electric vehicles, unmanned multi-purpose vehicles and robotic systems, established in 1992.

History

The electric motors for their vehicles are largely supplied by the Pula-based company Tema.

Dok-Ing Automotiv
The automotive division was formed upon the introduction of the electric car Dok-Ing XD in 2010.

In 2015, it produced two electric buses for the city of Koprivnica, as a part of the European project Civitas Dyn@mo. In the following year, it unveiled a multifunctional communal vehicle TOM TOM, which received awards from various international fairs. During the same year, it launched a serial production of electric scooters under the name "Core", with 800 of them already exported to Spain, Mexico, France, Italy and Malta in 2017. The batteries are produced by Dok-Ing. The company also launched a series of electric bikes called "Leo".

In 2017, it announced a new model of electric car, under the working name of YD, expected to have a range of 300–400 km.

Products

Current

Mine Clearance Vehicles

MV-4
MV-10

Fire Fighting Vehicles

MVF-5

Underground Mining Vehicles
MVD

Discontinued

Fire Fighting Vehicles
JELKA-4
JELKA-10

Mine Clearance Vehicles
MV-2
MV-3
MV-20

Robots
EOD

Future
FP7
XD4 (electric car).
XD2 (electric car)

International Users

References

External links
 Official website
 xd Electric city car site

Bus manufacturers of Croatia
Battery electric vehicle manufacturers
Robotics companies
Manufacturing companies based in Zagreb
Vehicle manufacturing companies established in 1992
Croatian brands
Truck manufacturers of Croatia
Electric vehicle manufacturers of Croatia